Los Fabulocos is an American, Cali-Mex band that is led by Jesus Cuevas, a vocalist and accordion player who used to be with the Blazers, an East Los Angeles-based group. It also features Kid Ramos, who has in the past worked with the Fabulous Thunderbirds.
Like, Malo, Los Lobos, El Chicano, the Blazers, and Tierra.

Background
They hail from East Los Angeles which has Americas largest Mexican-American community. Their music could be described as a mixture of traditional Spanish and Mexican music, Blues, R&B, and Rockabilly.

Among some of the songs they have recorded are "Crazy Baby" by Gene Maltais.

When Kid Ramos left the band in 2011 Al Martinez joined.

Band members
 James Barrios, Bass & Vocals
 Jesus Cuevas, Accordion & Vocals
 Kid Ramos, Bajo Sexto, Guitar & Vocals (Left 2011)
 Mike Molina, Drums 
 Al Martinez (Joined 2011)

Discography of releases
 Los Fabulocos, 2008 
 Dos, 2010

References

Hispanic and Latino American musicians
Tejano music groups
Rock music groups from California
2003 establishments in California
Musical groups established in 2003
Musical groups from Los Angeles
American musicians of Mexican descent